Mawlamyinegyun (also spelt Moulmeingyun and known as Mawgyun), is a town in the Ayeyarwady Region of south-west Burma. It is the seat of the Mawlamyinegyun Township in the Labutta District.

It is the setting for Ma Ma Lay's 1955 novel, Not Out of Hate.

External links
Satellite map at Maplandia.com

Populated places in Ayeyarwady Region
Township capitals of Myanmar